Hamadryas chloe, the Chloe cracker, is a species of cracker butterfly in the family Nymphalidae. It is found in Suriname, Peru, Colombia, Bolivia, and Brazil.

Subspecies
Hamadryas chloe chloe (Surinam, Peru, Colombia)
Hamadryas chloe daphnis (Peru, Bolivia)
Hamadryas chloe rhea (Brazil)
Hamadryas chloe obidona (Brazil)

References

Hamadryas (butterfly)
Lepidoptera of Brazil
Nymphalidae of South America
Butterflies described in 1787